Hostel is a 2011 Indian Hindi crime film by Manish Gupta. The film explores the psychology of ragging (hazing/initiation) and its disastrous effects on a student's psyche. It was directed by writer-director Manish Gupta, who had previously written Sarkar (2005) and directed The Stoneman Murders (2009).

The film, starring Vatsal Sheth, Tulip Joshi and Mukesh Tiwari, was released worldwide on 21 January 2011.

Plot
One night at the boys' hostel at Jaigarh University, a senior student Feroz (Mukesh Tiwari) and his goons harass freshman geek Vishnu Pandey (Subeer Goswamin), stripping him down, molesting him and forcing him to act like a dog. His cries for help fall on deaf ears. Karan (Vatsal Sheth), an engineering freshman, arrives at the hostel. He meets Vishnu, Nilesh (Ramesh Chandane) and Bobby (Nirmal Soni) and befriends them. That evening, Akshay, a gang leader, tries to extort money from him in front of dozens of senior males. When Karan refuses he is beaten and Akshay takes  him to Feroz. Feroz asks Karan to drink a glass of his urine and throws it at Karan's face when he refuses.

Vishnu tells Karan Feroz has deliberately been unsuccessful in his exams so that he can continue to live in luxury in the hostel and has become the general secretary by intimidating the students. He is politically well-connected, and is expected to stand for local elections within a few years. Karan is refused help by the corrupt hostel warden, Sharad Saxena, who is loyal to Feroz and Karan is beaten even more in his presence.

Feroz and his goons later ask Karan to do a striptease. When he refuses, they drag him out to the field, strip him naked in front of everyone and mock him. He is helped by Vishnu, Nilesh and Bobby. At the library, Karan breaks down crying as he recalls his humiliation. Science student Payal (Tulip Joshi) asks if he's okay and they become friends. Feroz's sadistic activities escalate and he starts selling drugs to students. Meanwhile, Karan and Payal fall in love.

Once, when Karan is with Payal, Karan is called by one of the goons for ragging. Karan refuses, so Akshay comes to him with a mini-gang of five. They instigate Karan by trying to harass Payal. Karan retaliates and ends up beating them all,  particularly Akshay. Feroz asks Akshay to take help from a gangster of his contact. When the gangster arrives with his goons Karan explains and convinces him that Feroz is using them. The gangster then tells Karan to contact him if he needs help. After this damage caused to his reputation by Akshay,  Feroz expels Akshay from the gang and threatens him to leave the hostel within 24 hours. Feroz offers Karan Akshay's place but is declined. He tells Karan that they will no longer bother him as long as he minds his own business. Over the year he and his goons continue to torture freshmen. Some bear it without resistance while some leave.

After a year, a naïve and weak new freshman, Pawan (Vinamra) arrives. In his room, he finds the goons, with Vishnu, Nilesh and Bobby, who have been corrupted by Feroz and are now part of his gang. They now believe that ragging results in manhood and this strains their relationship with Karan who befriends Pawan. One night, Feroz brings a prostitute to the hostel and asks Pawan to have unprotected sex with her to be witnessed by the entire gang and the warden. Karan interferes, saving Pawan although he takes a beating from Feroz. He is advised by Vishnu, Nilesh and Bobby  to mind his business but he ignores them. Later he helps Pawan study for an exam while Feroz and his gang watch porn. When Karan leaves, Feroz and the gang, intoxicated and aroused, enter Pawan's room and rape him.

A traumatized and pant less Pawan hangs himself from the ceiling fan with blood dripping down his legs, suggesting he was sodomized. The reluctant dean, under pressure from the trustees, blames the suicide on Pawan's psychological problems. Feroz warns Karan not to go to the press or he will rape Payal like he raped Pawan. Karan breaks up with Payal and sends her away to protect her. Later Karan procures a gun presumably from the gangster. That night, Karan locks all the hostel gates, goes to Feroz's room and shoots Vishnu, Bobby, Nilesh and the warden three times each. He gets into a fight with Feroz and his goons although he takes a vicious beating. Once he is holding the upper hand, despite the dean pleading with him not to kill Feroz as it will ruin his life, he shoots Feroz nine times, and ends the gang's reign of terror over the hostel.

Production
On the topic of Mukesh Tiwari being a bit too old to be a cast as a college student, Manish Gupta responded, "Mukesh Tiwari has been cast on purpose due to his age. He is shown to be a guy who's been failing for years together in order to remain in the university. He has a political agenda for being in the university. Using his clout as a student leader, he is attempting to enter state politics. The most shocking part is that guys like Mukesh Tiwari exist in real life. Each character in the film and each scene has been derived from heavy research and therefore has a base in reality."

Respondents validated the director's comments about the harsh realities:

Ajitesh Pathak said, "Innumberable examples of the Mukesh Tiwari character can be found in Kashi Vidyapeeth University in Banaras. How do you think leaders like Lalloo and Nitish Bhardwaj started their political journey. It was in University, where they just either keep failing or keep enrolling themselves in courses.  People as old as 45 years old are still students. Excellent topic, Manish. I know there will be comparisons with Haasil and Gulaal, because of the premises of the subject, but I hope people see it as an entirely different subject, as it is truly unique."

Srikanth added, "People like these do exist in real life. Osmania university, Hyderabad is one such place where a lot of students do one degree after another or they keep failing for number of years in order to stay at university."

Soundtrack
The music was composed by Virag Mishra. Lyrics were penned by Virag Mishra.

Track listing

References

External links

 
 

2011 films
2010s Hindi-language films
Social guidance films
Films set in India
Ragging
Films about hazing